The La Helvecia sawmill (Spanish: El aserradero La Helvecia) was a wood processing company founded in 1866 at 580 Calle Colón in San Fernando de la Buena Vista in the Gran Buenos Aires area, in Argentina

History 
The La Helvecia sawmill was founded in 1866 by Pedro Tamagni. It had a complete and modern plant with all the necessary elements for a production of 500,000 to 600,000 square metres of wooden boards, which around 1905 more or less corresponded to the monthly production of wooden boxes and furniture and other products of the woodworking industry in San Fernando.

It had excellent cutting machines, planers, etc., powered by two Ruston-Lincoln engines of 40 and 45 hp respectively. The wood, which was delivered to San Fernando from the islands on the Río Luján sea route underwent remarkable transformations in the sawmill within a few minutes, going from one machine to another until it was processed into boards of different lengths and then stored in some large storage yards until it was needed to build boxes and furniture.

The sawmill had its own boats, a narrow gauge railway, push waggons (chatas), trucks and other means of transport. The internal organisation of the sawmill was excellent, there was according to contemporary reports, exemplary harmony between the liberal factory management and the 150 workers. The company had its own island where it obtained raw material, in addition to what it purchased from forest owners on other islands. The La Helvecía sawmill fulfilled orders from the capital, but also from the interior, especially Santa Fe, Tucumán, Cordoba, San Juan, Mendoza, Ríos, Salta and Catamarca. There were also not a few customers in the neighbouring Republic of Uruguay.

The company, which no longer exists today, built and operated a  narrow gauge Decauville railway running over public land from the factory site to the railway station. The bridge still survives and is used today as a footbridge.

Today, the company Madergold S.A. mainly manufactures chipboard and fibreboard on the site.

References 

600 mm gauge railways in Argentina
Sawmills